Agriphila argentea is a moth in the family Crambidae. It was described by Graziano Bassi in 1999. It is found in Nepal.

References

Crambini
Moths described in 1999
Moths of Asia